The Fuzzy Pink Nightgown is a 1957 American romantic comedy film made by Russ-Field Productions and released by United Artists. It was directed by Norman Taurog from a screenplay by Richard Alan Simmons, based on a novel of the same name by Sylvia Tate and the jazzy music was composed and conducted by Billy May.

The film stars Jane Russell, Keenan Wynn and Ralph Meeker.

Plot 
Movie star Laurel Stevens (Jane Russell) has made a new film. It is called The Kidnapped Bride and gives a brainstorm to a couple of small-time crooks, Mike (Ralph Meeker) and Dandy (Keenan Wynn), to kidnap Laurel.

While they take her to a Malibu beachfront hideout, agent Barney Baylies (Robert H. Harris) and studio chief Martin (Adolphe Menjou) can't figure out why Laurel's a no-show at the premiere. Gossip columnist Daisy Parker (Benay Venuta) is dying to know, too, so a decision is made to avoid a scandal at all costs and not report Laurel missing to the police. Mike and Dandy want a $50,000 ransom. Laurel is insulted, feeling she's worth ten times that.

Laurel also fears this thing could hurt her career by looking like a publicity stunt. When Los Angeles police sergeant McBride (Fred Clark), who once sent Mike to prison, comes to Malibu to do a routine check on him, Laurel alters her appearance and pretends to be Mike's girl. The studio finally goes to the cops and also offers a $100,000 reward. The ransom money is taken to the airport, which is where the not-too-bright Dandy has a job. McBride notices a portrait of Laurel at the studio and suddenly realizes where he's just seen her.

Laurel has begun to fall for Mike for real. This time when McBride shows up, Laurel knocks him cold. She and Mike steal the cop's car and race to the airport. They get nabbed by the cops, but dim Dandy has picked up the wrong suitcase. There is no crime so there are no arrests, particularly since Laurel and Mike are now in love.

Cast 
 Jane Russell as Laurel Stevens
 Keenan Wynn as Dandy
 Ralph Meeker as Mike Peterson
 Fred Clark as Sergeant McBride
 Una Merkel as Bertha
 Adolphe Menjou as Arthur Martin
 Robert H. Harris as Barney Baylies
 Benay Venuta as Daisy Parker
 Bob Kelley as TV Announcer
 Dick Haynes as D.J.
 John Truax as Flack
 Milton Frome as Lieutenant Dempsey

Reception 
At the time of its release, The Fuzzy Pink Nightgown received mixed reviews, The Mirror News wrote "...a belabored attempt at comedy which never comes off. The pace is slow. While both Miss Russell and Mr. Wynn gallantly try for laughs, Meeker labors in a heavy-handed tough-guy fashion, completely at odds with the work of the others." Ruth Waterbury of the L.A. Examiner wrote that although "The Fuzzy Pink Nightgown is no classic among comedies...It's just a good natured romp, which treats nothing with reverence and it will do you nicely for a summer's day amusement." Waterbury praised Russell’s performance, "Miss Russell spoofs the glamour type she herself has been. She spoofs Hollywood, press agentry, even love.  What's more she makes you thoroughly enjoy it," but called Meeker the biggest weakness of the movie, ".. a fine stage actor though he is...he is too 'straight' in his work, and screen comedy appears not to be his forte." The Hollywood Reporter called it an "amusing farce [but] the farce is not sustained; it is occasionally abandoned altogether for some semi-serious romantic scenes that tend to break and confuse the mood.   However, applauded Russell, "[she] is responsible for the greater part of the picture's success, both in comedy and romance."

Director, Norman Taurog agreed with the critics about Jane's performance.  During an interview with Photoplay magazine, Taurog exclaimed: "Talent! The girl has a great flair for comedy. She has a fine talent. At first I thought she was aloof, but after a few days, I discovered, my to my amazement, that Jane was shy. When she warms up she’s wonderful. Her depth is wonderful, as an actress and as a woman. Now that I know her as well as I do, I'd love to work with her again. With the right script she could be out of this world. She's got a whole new career ahead of her. When they hung that sex tag on her, she started with two strikes.  But she's overcome that and more. Do I sound excited? I am. I'd like to see Jane do the old Eve Arden part in 'Stage Door.' She'd do a beautiful job.  Jane is really something special."

Production 
In 1954, Jane Russell formed a production company with her husband Bob Waterfield named Russ-Field. They signed with United Artist for a six-picture deal and for tax purposes, Jane could only appear in half of them.  Their first production in association with Voyager Productions was Gentlemen Marry Brunettes—a film Jane Russell did not want to make, but United Artist insisted that she star in the production as part of the Russ-Field deal.  Gentlemen Marry Brunettes fared poorly at the box office. Their next two productions, Run for the Sun (1956) and The King and Four Queens (1957), both made money. For Jane's next film, she chose The Fuzzy Pink Nightgown.

Director Norman Taurog wanted Dean Martin in the role of Mike but the role went to Ray Danton. However, Danton suddenly was let go from the picture. As reported by columnist Harrison Carroll" "...troubles have come up on the picture, Ray Danton playing opposite Jane, came down with a severe attack of laryngitis. He has worked only two and a half days. The company doesn't want to wait, so they are getting a new actor for the role." In early 1957, Hollywood columnist Erskine Johnson reported: "The 'laryngitis' announced for Ray Danton's bow-out as Jane Russell's leading man in Fuzzy Pink Nightgown turned out to be the fuzziest announcement of the year. The real reason Ray's out of the cast: After looking at the rushes, Producer Waterfield decided he was too young for Jane. Ralph Meeker is now playing the role." Danton was born in 1931, Russell in 1921, and Meeker in 1920.

About the movie, Russell wrote in her autobiography: "Norman [Taurog] saw the picture as strictly a Technicolor camp, while I had the mystery and romance of it in mind, in black and white. It should have been one way or the other, but as it turned out, it was neither. That was one time the star should have had nothing to say, I guess, because Norman would have made a comedy in color with Dean Martin in his first semi-serious role, which he's done fabulously since, and the publicity alone would have pulled it off, or we should have had another director. Norman still got his slapstick ending, but it just seemed old fashioned without color. The picture was neither fish nor fowl, but I still liked it.". Despite her honest assessment of the movie, Jane considered The Fuzzy Pink Nightgown, along with Gentlemen Prefer Blondes (1953) as the two favorite films of her career .

Boxoffice
Fuzzy Pink Nightgown bombed when it was released in the fall of 1957 and its failure marked the end of Russ-Field Productions. The movie didn't post a profit until the early 1960s due to frequent television airings.

Home Video 

In 2001 Amazon (company) issued a VHS of "The Fuzzy Pink Nightgown" in the 1.37 format.  Subsequently the movie has been available to stream on various apps and Amazon Prime Video offers it as a purchase or rental.  As of 2021, there has been no physical media release.

Soundtrack 
Imperial records released an LP soundtrack recording of Billy May's jazzy score at the time of the film's release, and it later became a collector's item. In 2012, Kritzerland Records released May's soundtrack on CD along with Alessandro Cicogini's score of A Breath of Scandal.

See also 
 List of American films of 1957

References

External links 
 
 
 
 

1957 comedy films
1957 films
American black-and-white films
American comedy films
1950s English-language films
Films about kidnapping
Films based on American novels
Films directed by Norman Taurog
Films scored by Billy May
Films set in Malibu, California
United Artists films
1950s American films